James Adams (February 18, 1810 – November 13, 1880) was a Massachusetts politician who served as the third mayor  of  Charlestown, Massachusetts.

Early life
James Adams, was born to Chester and Elizabeth (Watts) Adams, in Charlestown, Massachusetts.

Notes

1810 births
1880 deaths
Mayors of Charlestown, Massachusetts
19th-century American politicians